Ji Yun (1724–1805), also known as Ji Xiaolan or Ji Chunfan was a Chinese philosopher, politician, and writer. He was an influential scholar of Qing dynasty China and many anecdotes have been recorded about him. Ji Yun left behind a book entitled Notes of the Thatched Abode of Close Observations (閱微草堂筆記; The Shadow Book of Ji Yun, Empress Wu Books, 2021), and another book named Wenda Gong Yiji (紀文達公遺集; Collected Works of Lord Wenda, i.e. Ji Xiaolan), which was edited by later generations. He was often mentioned with Yuan Mei as the "Nan Yuan Bei Ji".

Background 
Ji Yun was born in Xian County of Hebei Province. When he was young, he was deemed intelligent. His father Ji Rongsu was a civil minister and archaeologist.

Career
In 1747, Ji Yun rose to intellectual prominence after winning the highest distinction in the provincial examinations. Several years later, in 1754, he attained the jinshi degree, whereupon he entered the Hanlin Academy.

Ji Yun's career was not, however, smooth sailing. In 1768, he became an accessory in a bribery case after he tipped off a brother-in-law about the severity of charges pending against him, for which crime he was banished to Dihua in Xinjiang Province.

On his return from Xinjiang, Ji was received by the Qianlong Emperor in 1771 when the ruler happened to be returning from Jehol to Beijing, and he was ordered to write a poem on the return of the Turgut Mongols from the banks of the Volga. Ji's rendition of the inspiring tale of the return of the exiled Mongols, later celebrated in English by poet Thomas de Quincey (1785–1859) in his epic Revolt of the Tartars, delighted the emperor, for whom he became an unofficial poet laureate. The job of compiling the Siku Quanshu was his dubious reward.

One year later, Ji Yun was pardoned from his sentence, and, on his return journey in 1771, he wrote a travel account distilled into 160 poems titled Xinjiang zalu (新疆杂录; Assorted verses on Xinjiang). This remains one of the most useful sources in Chinese on life in Xinjiang Province in the late-eighteenth century.

Personal life
He was an avid tobacco smoker, which he famously smoked with his pipe. He was an enthusiastic food gourmet with a special liking for fatty pork and strong tea and disliked starchy staple foods like rice, potatoes, wheat and corn. He loved women and had many concubines throughout his life. It was said he consummated with five different women every day. He seldom rode sedan chairs and preferred to walk.

In the first year of the Jiaqing Emperor's reign, he was appointed as the secretary of defense. Despite his bad habits, Ji Yun died in his sleep at the grand old age of age of 81 in 1805.

During his later years, Ji Yun became one of the three great writers of strange tales in Qing dynasty China (the other two were Pu Songling and Yuan Mei). His tales included "true" weird tales, investigations of paranormal phenomena, as well as horror stories, parables, accounts of strange natural phenomena, and satirical portraits of prominent Neo-Confucian scholars and government officials.

Achievement
1747- Ranked number one provincial graduate
1754- Ranked number one graduate of the palace examination
1773- Chief editor for the Siku Quanshu, the largest collection of books in Chinese history
1796- Minister of war
1797- Minister of Personnel

Between 1789 and 1798, Ji Yun published five collections of supernatural tales, and in 1800 the five volumes were produced under the collective title Yuewei Caotang Biji (閱微草堂筆記; Jottings from the grass hut for examining minutiae; The Shadow Book of Ji Yun: The Chinese Classic of Weird True Tales, Horror Stories, and Occult Knowledge).

In addition, Ji Yun was also well known as magnum opus of Qing editorial achievement, Siku quanshu (The Complete Library in Four Branches), where he edited this massive work together with Lu Xixiong, in compliance with an imperial edict issued by the Qianlong Emperor.

Poetry
One poem by Ji Yun is shown below:

"A Sail in the Glass"
Countless welcoming good mountains along the river,
My eyes are lit up as soon as I'm out of Hangzhou,
Misty river banks with mixed sky and green,
A sail in the glass.

Mansion
The mansion in which Ji Yun lived for the last thirty years of his life was originally the residence of General Yue Zhongqi (1686–1754), the twenth-first generational descendant of the renowned anti-Jurchen, Song dynasty loyalist and general Yue Fei, who is one of the most renowned figures in Chinese history. General Yue fought alongside General Nian Gengyao in quelling Tibetan rebels in what is today Qinghai, and was highly honoured in Beijing. He never lived for very long in the capital, his base being in Sichuan and Gansu. However, he was rewarded for his service to the throne by the Kangxi Emperor and raised to the position of duke of the third class.

Ji Yun lived in the mansion for thirty years and several features of the dwelling that the visitor can still see today are associated with him. A tree in the garden is said to be more than two hundred years old. Few original items from the time of Ji Yun remain in the house but the caretaker claims that the desk and mirror in the main study are original items. The glass mirror in the zitan timber frame is one of the earliest mirrors produced with lead paint in China.

After Ji Xiaolan's death, his descendants rented half of the mansion complex out to Huang Antao (1777–1847), a jinshi scholar, Hanlin scholar and poet, like Ji Yun. Huang was a renowned calligrapher; several of his calligraphic pieces are in the collection of the Palace Museum.

Popular culture
Ji, portrayed by Zhang Guoli, is the titular character in the mainland Chinese TV series The Eloquent Ji Xiaolan. The series mainly revolve around Ji, his rival Heshen (portrayed by Wang Gang), the Qianlong Emperor (portrayed by Zhang Tielin), along with court events in the Qing dynasty. Unlike Zhang however, the real Ji Yun was known for being obese in stature.

References

Bibliography
Yu, Yi I. and John Yu Branscum, editors and translators. The Shadow Book of Ji Yun: The Chinese Classic of Weird True Tales, Horror Stories, and Occult Knowledge.  Empress Wu Books, 2021.
Pollard, David (trans.). Real Life in China at the Height of Empire. Revealed by the Ghosts of Ji Xiaolan. Hong Kong: The Chinese University Press, 2014.  . A recent (as of 2015) translation of selected notes from the Yuewei caotang biji.

External links
 

1724 births
1805 deaths
18th-century Chinese writers
Assistant Grand Secretaries
Chinese Confucianists
Philosophers from Hebei
Politicians from Cangzhou
18th-century Chinese philosophers
Qing dynasty politicians from Hebei
Qing dynasty writers
Writers from Hebei